Whiskey Tango Foxtrot is a 2014 debut novel by David Shafer.

Plot
A pop thriller about a multinational cabal planning to subjugate humanity by privatizing all information.

References

Sources
Hoffert, B. 2014. "Upcoming First Novels You Shouldn't Miss, Including Adi Alsaid's Let's Get Lost, Jessie Burton's The Miniaturist, Elizabeth Little's Dear Daughter, and David Shafer's Whiskey Tango Foxtrot, Plus Excerpts from Indie Press Titles". Library Journal. 139, no. 12: 32-36.

2014 American novels
American thriller novels
Mulholland Books books
2014 debut novels